Bachia scolecoides, Vanzolini's bachia, is a species of lizard in the family Gymnophthalmidae. It is endemic to Brazil.

References

Bachia
Reptiles of Brazil
Endemic fauna of Brazil
Reptiles described in 1961
Taxa named by Paulo Vanzolini